Sisillius III was a legendary king of the Britons as accounted by Geoffrey of Monmouth.  He was preceded by Oenus and succeeded by Beldgabred. He shares his name with one of the sons of Ebraucus and his ancestors Sisillius II and Sisillius I.

References

Legendary British kings